Blagoje Bersa  (born as Benito Bersa, 21 December 1873 – 1 January 1934) was a Croatian musical composer of substantial influence. 

Bersa was born in Dubrovnik.  He studied in Zagreb with Ivan Zajc and at the Vienna Conservatory with Robert Fuchs and Julius Epstein. In 1919 he returned to Zagreb, where he worked as a composition teacher at the music academy. He remained there until his death.

Works

Operas
 Der Eisenhammer (Oganj), Opera, 1911
 Der Schuster von Delft (Postolar od Delfta), Opera after Hans Christian Andersen, 1914.
 Jelka, Opera, 1901

Popular works
 Sablasti (Apparitions) & Sunčana polja (Sunny Fields), symphonic diptych 
 Sinfonia tragica "Quattro ricordi della mia vita" (Tragic symphony - Four memories of my life) in C-minor
 Overture drammatica (Dramatic Overture), Op. 25a
 Idillio "Il giorno delle mie nozze" (Idyll - The Day of my Wedding), Op. 25b
 Capriccio-Scherzo, Op. 25c
 Finale "Vita nuova" (Finale - New Life), Op. 25d (unfinished; piano sketch. Orchestrated by his student Zvonimir Bradić, who Bersa gave the exclusive right to do so before he died)
 Hamlet, symphonic poem
 Povero Tonin, elegy for violin and piano
 Andante sostenuto for orchestra

Piano works (not a complete list)
(with Opus number)

 Valzer in A Major, Op. 3
 Minuet, Op. 11
 Theme & Variations, Op. 15
 Bagatella, Op. 16
 Rondo-Polonaise, Op. 18
 Piano Sonata No. 1 in C Major, Op. 19
 Piano Sonata No. 2 in F Minor, Op. 20
 Marcia trionfale, Op. 24
 Fantaisie-Impromptu, Op. 27
 Ora triste, Op. 37
 Notturno, Op. 38
 Fantasia breve, Op. 56
 Venecijanska barkarola, Op. 58
 Riso e lamento, Op. 63
 Ballade in D Minor, Op. 65
 Novelette, Op. 69
 Valse-Mélancolique in A minor, Op. 76 (NB: there are two works published as Opus 76. In spite of their similar titles, they are not related)
 Mélancolie in F-sharp minor, Op. 76 (NB: there are two works published as Opus 76. In spite of their similar titles, they are not related)

(without Opus number)
 Ballabile
 Bizarna serenada
 Na žalu
 Serenade-Barcarolle
 Stari mornar priča
 Trois Airs de ballet ("Po načinu starih")

References

External links
 
 Origin of family Bersa de Leidenthal (Heraldrys Institute of Rome)

1873 births
1934 deaths
Croatian composers
People from Dubrovnik
People from the Kingdom of Dalmatia
Burials at Mirogoj Cemetery
Austro-Hungarian musicians